Gyral is an album by Scorn, originally released in 1995 on Scorn Recordings. Nic Bullen left the group in 1995, so the project continued on as an essentially solo project for Mick Harris. As a result, much output since Gyral has been minimalist beats with an emphasis on very deep bass lines, often resembling dub and trip hop in structure.

Reception

Track listing

Personnel

Scorn
Mick Harris – Instruments, mixing

Additional musicians and production
Ruth Collins – artwork
Noel Summerville – mastering

References

1995 albums
Music in Birmingham, West Midlands
Scorn (band) albums
Albums produced by Mick Harris